Bernard Richard (born April 11, 1951) is a Canadian social worker, lawyer, and politician in the Province of New Brunswick.

Early life and education
Raised and educated in Cap-Pelé, New Brunswick, Richard earned a Bachelor of Arts degree from the University of Moncton and a Bachelor of Laws degree from the University of New Brunswick.

Political career
He first entered politics as a young man, running unsuccessfully in Shediac for the Legislative Assembly of New Brunswick as a Parti Acadien candidate in the 1974 election. He became involved in municipal politics in the village of Cap-Pélé. His second entry into provincial politics was in the 1991 election, this time as a Liberal. He won. He was re-elected in 1995, 1999 and 2003.

He was named to cabinet in 1995 and left in 1998 to contest the leadership of the Liberal Party. He was unsuccessful in his leadership bid and was returned to the cabinet position by Camille Thériault who was the victor in the contest. Richard managed to be re-election by the largest margin of any candidate in the 1999 election, despite the fact that his party suffering a massive defeat.

When Thériault resigned as leader in 2001, Richard briefly considered another run but instead became interim leader. When Shawn Graham became leader in 2002, Richard was made House Leader and finance critic, two key roles in the opposition. Richard maintained these roles after the 2003 election.

The Progressive Conservative government of Bernard Lord had won a bare majority in 2003, winning 28 of 55 seats and were anxious to strengthen their position. After first attempting to convince a Liberal to sit as speaker and then offering cabinet positions and other appointments to several Liberals, Richard accepted the post of provincial ombudsman, thus resigning his seat and increasing the Tory majority to 28/54 for the ensuing year before a by-election was held.

On November 6, 2007, New Brunswick news outlets reported that the Progressive Conservatives were encouraging Richard to leave his post as ombudsman and return to politics as leader of their party.

Notes

References
 Biography, Office of the Ombudsman, New Brunswick

1951 births
Living people
Acadian people
Canadian social workers
Lawyers in New Brunswick
Members of the Executive Council of New Brunswick
New Brunswick Liberal Association MLAs
New Brunswick municipal councillors
Université de Moncton alumni
University of New Brunswick alumni
People from Westmorland County, New Brunswick
Politicians from Toronto
University of New Brunswick Faculty of Law alumni
21st-century Canadian politicians